Isa and Jutta Günther (born 27 May 1938 Munich) are two German actresses and former child actresses.

Biography
Twin sisters Isa and Jutta were trained in ballet for nine years. They began their film careers in 1950 in Two Times Lotte. Though  this film was a box office hit, which also earned Erich Kästner the Filmband in Gold, the subsequent heimatfilms in which the twin sisters appeared were more or less forgotten. The two also had a guest role in the 1954 musical film An jedem Finger zehn, with Bibi Johns and Josephine Baker among others.

Isa played only two roles without her twin sister, Klara Sesemann in the films Heidi (1952) and Heidi and Peter (1955).

The Günther twins ended their film careers at the age of 20, later married and moved into private life. By her marriage Jutta became Jutta Günther-Westerbarkey.

Filmography (selected)
 1950: Two Times Lotte (from the book by Erich Kästner)
 1952: Die Wirtin von Maria Wörth
 1952: Heidi
 1953: 
 1954: The First Kiss 
 1954: Ten on Every Finger 
 1955: Du bist die Richtige
 1955: Heidi and Peter
 1956: Love, Summer and Music
 1956: Die Fischerin vom Bodensee
 1957: Vier Mädels aus der Wachau
 1957: The Twins from Zillertal 
 1958: Der Sündenbock von Spatzenhausen

References

External links

German film actresses
German twins
German child actresses
1938 births
Living people